The Wik Elken (Wik-Kalkan), or Wik-Ngatharr, were an indigenous Australian people, one of the Wik tribes of the Cape York Peninsula of the state of Queensland.

Language
The Wik-Kalkan language belonged to the Wik language group.

Country

People
The Wik-Kalkan has been described under the name of Wikngatara by Ursula McConnel in various papers. This term actually was a language name, rather than an ethnonym, and signified 'my language'. McConnel realized her error shortly before her death, and notified Tindale of the oversight.

Alternative names
 Wik-ngatara, (erroneous term)
 Wik Alkän.
 Wikkalkin.
 Wik-nätara.
 Algan.
 Ngadara.

Notes

Citations

Sources

Aboriginal peoples of Queensland